Burton-on-Trent Cricket Club Ground  is a cricket ground in Burton, England used by Derbyshire CCC for 13 first-class matches between 1914 and 1937. The ground also hosted two ICC Trophy matches - Canada v Hong Kong in 1982 and East Africa v Malaysia in 1986.

Game Information:
{| class="wikitable"
|-
! Game Type
! No. of Games
|-
| County Championship Matches
| 13
|-
| limited-over county matches
| 0
|-
| Twenty20 matches
| 0
|}

Game Statistics: first-class:
{| class="wikitable"
|-
! Category
! Information
|-
| Highest Team Score
| There have been no instances of a team making 500 runs in an innings on this ground
|-
| Lowest Team Score
| Cambridge University (107 against Derbyshire) in 1976
|-
| Best Batting Performance
| Brian Bolus (151 Runs for Derbyshire against Oxford University in 1975
|-
| Best Bowling Performance
| Srinivasaraghavan Venkataraghavan (8/77 for Derbyshire against Oxford University) in 1975
|}

External links
 Cricinfo Website - Ground Page
 Cricket Archive page

Cricket grounds in Staffordshire